Xanthe Ryder (15 May 1926 – 1 January 1998) was a British alpine skier. She competed in two events at the 1948 Winter Olympics.

References

1926 births
1998 deaths
British female alpine skiers
Olympic alpine skiers of Great Britain
Alpine skiers at the 1948 Winter Olympics
Sportspeople from London